The 2011 Butler Bulldogs football team represented Butler University as a member of the Pioneer Football League (PFL) during the 2011 NCAA Division I FCS football season. The Bulldogs were led by sixth-year head coach Jeff Voris and played their home games at the Butler Bowl. Butler compiled an overall record of 5–6 with a mark of 3–5 in conference play, tying for sixth place in the PFL.

Schedule

Roster

References

Butler
Butler Bulldogs football seasons
Butler Bulldogs football